Kgagodi is an exposed meteorite crater in Botswana, roughly 7 kilometres south of the village of Kgagodi, where it got its name.

It is 3.5 km in diameter and the age is roughly less than 180 million years. It is estimated to be from the late Cretaceous to early Tertiary Period. The crater is best known for being Botswana’s first recognised impact structure.

History
The Kgagodi crater first came to attention in 1997, when a Botswana water-drilling expedition came across an elliptical-shaped structure. It was filled with sediment. The Geological Survey of Botswana then drilled a core sample that was 274 meters deep. The core sample suggested that it may be an impact structure, but there was no definite evidence for it. It was during another study of the structure that yielded the answer. Impact breccia were soon discovered, confirming Kgagodi as an impact crater.

See also 
 List of impact craters in Africa

References

Further reading 
 Brandt, D., Holmes, H., Reimold, W.U., Paya, B.K., Koeberl, C., Hancox,P.J., Kgagodi Basin: The first impact recognized in Botswana, Meteoritics & Planetary Science 37, 1765 - 1779. 2002
 Reimold, W. U., Paya, B.K., Holmes, H., Brandt, D., Koeberl, C., Dladla, C. and Hancox,P.J., Kgagodi Basin, Botswana: Origin by meteorite impact confirmed! 63rd Annual Meteoritical Society Meeting. Abs. No. 5009. 2000

Impact craters of Botswana
Jurassic impact craters
Jurassic Africa
Central District (Botswana)